Christian philosophy includes all philosophy carried out by Christians, or in relation to the religion of Christianity.
Christian philosophy emerged with the aim of reconciling science and faith, starting from natural rational explanations with the help of Christian revelation. Several thinkers such as Origen of Alexandria and Augustine believed that there was a harmonious relationship between science and faith, others such as Tertullian claimed that there was contradiction and others tried to differentiate them.

There are scholars who question the existence of a Christian philosophy itself. These claim that there is no originality in Christian thought and its concepts and ideas are inherited from Greek philosophy. Thus, Christian philosophy would protect philosophical thought, which would already be definitively elaborated by Greek philosophy.

However, Boehner and Gilson claim that Christian philosophy is not a simple repetition of ancient philosophy, although they owe to Greek science the knowledge developed by Plato, Aristotle and the Neo-Platonists. They even claim that in Christian philosophy, Greek culture survives in organic form.

Historical aspects
Christian philosophy began around the 3rd century. It arises through the movement of the Christian community called Patristics, which initially had as a main objective the defense of Christianity. As Christianity spread, patristic authors increasingly engaged with the philosophical schools of the hellenized Roman Empire, and ultimately learned from some aspects of these surrounding ideas how to better articulate Christianity's own revelation of Jesus Christ as God incarnate and one with God the Father and God the Spirit. Many scholars consider Origen of Alexandria to be the first Christian teacher to fully present Christian philosophy and metaphysics as a stronger alternative to other schools (especially Platonism). See Origen Against Plato by Mark J. Edwards and the introduction to Origen: On First Principles translated and introduced by John Behr as two prominent examples of this history of a specifically Christian philosophy and metaphysics.

From the 11th century onwards, Christian philosophy was manifested through Scholasticism. This is the period of medieval philosophy that extended until the 15th century, as pointed out by T. Adão Lara. From the 16th century onwards, Christian philosophy, with its theories, started to coexist with independent scientific and philosophical theories.

The development of Christian ideas represents a break with the philosophy of the Greeks, bearing in mind that the starting point of Christian philosophy is the Christian religious message.

Lara divides Christian philosophy into three eras:
 Early philosophy: Patristics (2nd-7th centuries).
 Medieval philosophy: Scholastics (9th-13th centuries).
 Pre-modern (14th-15th centuries).

Characteristics

Natural demonstration

The philosophical starting point of Christian philosophy is logic, not excluding Christian theology. Although there is a relationship between theological doctrines and philosophical reflection in Christian philosophy, its reflections are strictly rational. On this way of seeing the two disciplines, if at least one of the premises of an argument is derived from revelation, the argument falls in the domain of theology; otherwise it falls into philosophy's domain.

Justification of truths of faith
Fundamentally, Christian philosophical ideals are to make religious convictions rationally evident through natural reason. The Christian philosopher's attitude is determined by faith in matters relating to cosmology and everyday life. Unlike the Secular philosopher, the Christian philosopher seeks conditions for the identification of eternal truth, being characterized by religiosity

There is criticism of Christian philosophy because the Christian religion is hegemonic at this time and centralizes the elaboration of all values. The coexistence of philosophy and religion is questioned, as philosophy itself is critical and religion founded on revelation and established dogmas. Lara believes that there was questioning and writings with philosophical characteristics in the Middle Ages, although religion and theology predominated. In this way it was established by dogmas, in some aspects, did not prevent significant philosophical constructions.

Tradition
A Christian philosophy developed from predecessor philosophies. Justin is based on Greek philosophy, an academy in Augustine and Patristics. It is in the tradition of Christian philosophical thought or Judaism, from whom it was inherited from the Old Testament and more fundamentally in the Gospel message, which records or at the center of the message advocated by Christianity.

Scholasticism received influence from both Jewish philosophy and Islamic philosophy. This Christian Europe did not remain exclusively influenced by itself, but it suffered strong influences from other cultures.

Systematizing view
The ‘Divine Unity’ (attempts) ‘intercedes’ to systematically and comprehensively systematize the problems of ‘global/worldly’ reality ‘on’ a ‘cosmic-harmonic-balance’ whole. There is a lack of creative ‘Divine Spirit!’, which is compensated by the overall vision. Christian Revelation itself provides the Christian with an overview’!’
@St.John of the cross

See also

 Arguments for the existence of God
 Biblical studies
 Christian apologetics
 Christian humanism
 Catholic theology
 Ethics in the Bible
 Judeo-Christian ethics
 Sobornost
 Theism
 Thomism

Citations

References
 Boehner, Philoteus. Gilson, Etienne. História da filosofia cristã: desde às origens até Nicolau de Cusa, 8a edição, Petrópolis, Vozes, 2003.
 Lara, Tiago Adão. Curso de história da filosofia: A filosofia nos tempos e contratempos da cristandade ocidental, Petrópolis, Vozes, 1999.
 Störig, Hans Joachim. História Geral da Filosofia, Petrópolis, Vozes, 2008.

Further reading
 
 
 Richmond, James. Faith and Philosophy, in series, Knowing Christianity. London: Hodder and Stoughton, 1966.

External links
 The Institute for Faithful Research